Proposition 7 may refer to:

 Proposition 7 (Wittgenstein) of Wittgenstein's Tractatus Logico-Philosophicus
 California Proposition 7 (2008) (concerning renewable energy)
 California Proposition 7 (1978) (concerning death penalty)
 California Proposition 7 (1911) (concerning direct democracy)
 California Proposition 7 (2018) (concerning daylight saving time)